Solaris is a space combat game for the Atari 2600 published in 1986 by Atari Corporation. It was developed by Doug Neubauer, who owns the copyright and the Solaris trademark. The game is a sequel to Neubauer's Atari 8-bit family game Star Raiders from 1979. Both games feature an enemy race known as Zylons, but Star Raiders uses a first-person perspective while Solaris is in third-person.

Solaris was at one point going to be based on The Last Starfighter, while the Atari 8-bit version of The Last Starfighter was renamed Star Raiders 2.

Gameplay
The galaxy of Solaris is made up of 16 quadrants, each containing 48 sectors. The player uses a tactical map to choose a sector to warp to, during which they must attempt to keep their ship "in focus" to lower their fuel consumption rate. Fuel must be carefully managed, as an empty tank results in loss of one of the player lives. Space battle ensues whenever the player navigates into a hostile battlegroup via the tactical map. Space enemies include pirate ships, mechanoid ships, and aggressive "cobra" ships. Each battlegroup has at least one enemy flagship, which shoots out fuel-sapping drones.

The player may also descend to one of 3 types of planets:
 Friendly federation planets, which provide for refueling, but may also harbor a planet defense mission if they are under attack. If players allow a friendly planet in a quadrant to be destroyed, that quadrant becomes a "red zone" where joystick controls are reversed and booming sounds are overheard.
 Enemy Zylon planets, in which the player must rescue all cadets, gaining an extra ship when all cadets are rescued.
 Enemy corridor planets, in which the player must traverse through a fast-paced corridor.

There are 4 kinds of ground enemies found on planets: stationary guardians, gliders, targeters and raiders. The ultimate goal of Solaris is to reach the planet Solaris and rescue its colonists, at which point the game ends in victory.

See also

List of Atari 2600 games

References

External links
Solaris at Atari Mania
Solaris at AtariAge
Interview with Doug Neubauer
Doug Neubauer on the Solaris manual

1986 video games
Atari games
Atari 2600 games
Atari 2600-only games
Rail shooters
Space combat simulators
Video games developed in the United States
Video games set in outer space
Video games set on fictional planets